The table below shows all results of Ford World Rally Team in World Rally Championship.

WRC results

Group 4 era

Group B era

Group A era

WRC era

J-WRC results

References
 results at juwra.com

External links
 Official website Ford World Rally Team
 Official website Ford Abu Dhabi World Rally Team Image Library
 M-Sport website

results
World Rally Championship constructor results